Roland Bala (born 18 September 1990) is a Papua New Guinean footballer who plays as a defender for Southern United.

While playing for Southern United, Bala was discharged without conviction for indecently assaulting a woman in a Dunedin club. The judge gave him a discharge as Bala is due to have surgery to his knee that would require 12 months recuperation, while if convicted he would have been deported from New Zealand and not had the surgery.

References

1990 births
Living people
Papua New Guinean footballers
Association football defenders
Papua New Guinea international footballers
Place of birth missing (living people)
2016 OFC Nations Cup players